Penthouse Rhythm is a 1945 American comedy film directed by Edward F. Cline and written by Stanley Roberts and Howard Dimsdale. The film stars Kirby Grant, Lois Collier, Edward Norris, Maxie Rosenbloom, Eric Blore, Minna Gombell and Edward Brophy. The film was released on June 22, 1945, by Universal Pictures.

Cast        
Kirby Grant as Dick Ryan
Lois Collier as Linda Reynolds
Edward Norris as Charles Henry Holmes Jr.
Maxie Rosenbloom as Maxie Rosenbloom
Eric Blore as Ferdy Pelham
Minna Gombell as Taffy
Edward Brophy as Bailey
Judy Clark as Patty Davis
Marion Martin as Irma King
Donald MacBride as Brewster
Henry Armetta as Joe
Jimmie Dodd as Hank Davis
Bobby Worth as Johnny Davis
Louis DaPron as Bill Davis
George Lloyd as Nick Carson
Paul Hurst as Police Desk Sergeant
Harry Barris as Tim Noonan
Fred Velasco as Dancer
Lenee as Dancer

References

External links
 

1945 films
American comedy films
1945 comedy films
Universal Pictures films
Films directed by Edward F. Cline
American black-and-white films
1940s English-language films
1940s American films